David Deroo (born 11 March 1985 in Roubaix) is a French former racing cyclist.

Major results
2002
 10th Flanders-Europe Classic
2003
 2nd Paris–Roubaix Juniors
2005
 2nd Grand Prix Bavay
2006
 1st Stage 6 Tour de Bretagne
 9th Overall Circuit des Ardennes

References

1985 births
Living people
French male cyclists
Sportspeople from Roubaix
Cyclists from Hauts-de-France